The Right Reverend Caesar Gatimu (born 18 May 1921, Limuru, Kenyadied 20 February 1987, Nyeri, Kenya) was the Roman Catholic Bishop of Nyeri, Kenya.

Vocation
On 17 March 1947, aged 25, Gatimu was ordained as a priest of the Archdiocese of Nyeri, Kenya.

On 18 April 1961, close to age 40, he was appointed as Auxiliary Bishop of Nyeri and as Bishop Titular of Abila in Palaestina. The following month he was ordained as the Bishop Titular of Abila in Palaestina. His principal consecrator was Pope John XXIII. On 25 November 1964, aged 43, he was appointed Bishop of Nyeri.

Death
On 20 February 1987, he died at the age of 65, having been a priest for almost 40 years and a bishop for more than twenty years.

Legacy
Bishop Gatimu Ngandu Girls High School

External links
Catholic Hierarchy website - Basic history of Bishop Gatimu

1921 births
1987 deaths
People from Nyeri County
Participants in the Second Vatican Council
20th-century Roman Catholic bishops in Kenya
Roman Catholic bishops of Nyeri
Kenyan Roman Catholic bishops